Falls of Roy is a waterfall of Scotland.

See also

Waterfalls of Scotland

References

Waterfalls of Scotland